Radhe Maa (born 4 April 1965) is a self styled Indian "Godwoman". She has been involved with families in Mukeria, Punjab, Mumbai, Delhi, Haryana and abroad. She was born in Dorangala village, Gurdaspur district in Punjab. She made her debut in TV as a guest in Bigg Boss 14.

Early life  
Her followers state that she was drawn to spirituality as a child, and spent a lot of time at the Kali temple in her village. However, according to people of her village, she did not show any spiritual leanings as a child. Kaur studied till Class IV.

As a spiritual leader 
During her early years in Mumbai, Radhe Maa used to frequently travel back to Hoshiarpur and Kapurthala in Punjab for satsangs. Later she started giving her money to poor for gaining more followers in Mumbai, Delhi and other cities. A lot of veteran Bollywood and TV actors/actresses are also reported to be bhakts (devotees) has Radhe Maa.  A well known Bollywood director Subhash Ghai visited Radhe Maa to take her blessings.

References

1965 births
Living people
21st-century Hindu religious leaders
People from Punjab, India